This is a list of the Japanese species of the superfamilies Zygaenoidea, Sesioidea, Cossoidea and Tortricoidea. It also acts as an index to the species articles and forms part of the full List of moths of Japan.

Epipyropidae
 セミヤドリガ  — Epipomponia nawai (Dyar, 1904)
 ハゴロモヤドリガ  — Epiricania hagoromo Kato, 1939

Limacodidae
 オガサワライラガ  — Belippa boninensis (Matsumura, 1931)
 ツマジロイラガ  — Belippa horrida Walker, 1865
 オキナワシロイラガ  — Narosa azumai Inoue, 1976
 カバフシロイラガ  — Narosa corusca amamiana Kawazoe & Ogata, [1963]
 ヒメシロイラガ  — Narosa edoensis Kawada, 1930
 ウスマダライラガ  — Narosa fulgens (Leech, 1889)
 ヒメマダライラガ  — Kitanola masayukii Sasaki, 1998
 ミナミマダライラガ  — Kitanola meridiana Sasaki, 1998
 ビロードマダライラガ  — Kitanola sachalinensis Matsumura, 1925
 マダライラガ  — Kitanola uncula (Staudinger, 1887)
 クロマダライラガ  — Mediocampa speciosa (Inoue, 1956)
 ナシイラガ  — Narosoideus flavidorsalis (Staudinger, 1887)
 オキナワナシイラガ  — Narosoideus ochridorsalis Inoue, 1982
 ヒメクロイラガ  — Scopelodes contracta Walker, 1855
 イラガ  — Monema flavescens Walker, 1855
 カギバイラガ  — Heterogenea asella ([Denis & Schiffermüller], 1775)
 テングイラガ  — Microleon longipalpis Butler, 1885
 アカイラガ  — Phrixolepia sericea Butler, 1877
 アマミアカイラガ  — Phrixolepia tenebrosa Kawazoe & Ogata, [1963]
 オキナワイラガ  — Matsumurides okinawanus (Matsumura, 1931)
 ムラサキイラガ  — Austrapoda dentata (Oberthür, 1879)
 ウスムラサキイラガ  — Austrapoda hepatica Inoue, 1987
 アオイラガ  — Parasa consocia Walker, 1863
 ヒロヘリアオイラガ  — Parasa lepida lepida (Cramer, 1777)
 クロシタアオイラガ  — Parasa sinica Moore, 1877
 ウストビイラガ  — Ceratonema sericeum (Butler, 1881)
 ウスグロイラガ  — Susica nasuta Inoue, 1986
 タイワンイラガ  — Phlossa conjuncta (Walker, 1855)
 クロスジイラガ  — Natada takemurai Inoue, 1986
 ベニイラガ  — Demonarosa rufotessellata  (Moore, 1879)
Demonarosa rufotessellata issiki (Kawazoe & Ogata, 1962)
 ヒロズイラガ  — Naryciodes posticalis Matsumura, 1931
 マルモンイラガ  — Trichogyia circulifera Hering, 1933
 ハスオビイラガ  — Darna pallivitta (Moore, 1877)
 キンケウスバイラガ  — Pseudopsyche endoxantha Püngeler, 1914
 トビスジイラガ  — Isopenthocrates japona Yoshimoto, 2004

Zygaenidae
 ウォンサンスカシクロバ  — Illiberis assimilis Jordan, 1907
 ルリイロスカシクロバ  — Illiberis consimilis Leech, 1898
 和名未定  — Illiberis nigra (Leech, [1889])
 リンゴハマキクロバ  — Illiberis pruni Dyar, 1905
 オオスカシクロバ  — Illiberis psychina (Oberthür, 1880)
 ウメスカシクロバ  — Illiberis rotundata Jordan, [1907]
 ブドウスカシクロバ  — Illiberis tenuis (Butler, 1877)
 ホソバスカシクロバ  — Illiberis yuennanensis Alberti, 1951
 キスジホソマダラ  — Balataea gracilis gracilis (Walker, [1865])
 タマツジホソマダラ  — Balataea kimurai Owada & Inaba, 2005
 ヤホシホソマダラ  — Balataea octomaculata (Bremer, 1861)
 ヒメクロバ  — Artona funeralis (Butler, 1879)
 タケノホソクロバ  — Artona martini Efetov, 1997
 エサキマダラ  — Clelea esakii Inoue, 1958
 ウスバクロマダラ  — Inope heterogyna Staudinger, 1887
 ウスグロマダラ  — Inope maerens Staudinger, 1887
 ヘリジロクロマダラ  — Pseudoinope fusca (Leech, [1889])
 コガタクロマダラ  — Inouela exiguitata (Inoue, 1978)
 ルリハダホソクロバ  — Rhagades pruni esmeralda (Butler, 1877)
 オキナワルリチラシ久米島亜種  — Eterusia aedea azumai Owada, 2001
 オキナワルリチラシ徳之島亜種  — Eterusia aedea hamajii Owada, 2001
 オキナワルリチラシ中之島亜種  — Eterusia aedea masatakasatoi Owada, 2001
 オキナワルリチラシ屋久島種子島亜種  — Eterusia aedea micromaculata Inoue, 1982
 オキナワルリチラシ八重山亜種  — Eterusia aedea okinawana Matsumura, 1931
 オキナワルリチラシ沖縄本島亜種  — Eterusia aedea sakaguchii Matsumura, 1931
 オキナワルリチラシ本土亜種  — Eterusia aedea sugitanii Matsumura, 1927
 オキナワルリチラシ奄美亜種  — Eterusia aedea tomokunii Owada, 1989
 ツシマキモンチラシ  — Eterusia watanabei Inoue, 1982
 サツマニシキ奄美・沖縄本島亜種  — Erasmia pulchella fritzei Jordan, 1908
 サツマニシキ屋久島種子島亜種  — Erasmia pulchella kumageana Inoue, 1976
 サツマニシキ本土亜種  — Erasmia pulchella nipponica Inoue, 1976
 サツマニシキ八重山亜種  — Erasmia pulchella sakishimana Inoue, 1976
 ホタルガ  — Pidorus atratus Butler, 1877
 シロシタホタルガ  — Neochalcosia remota (Walker, 1854)
 ルリモンホタルガ  — Chalcosia auxo diana Butler, 1877
 メスジロホタルガ  — Chalcosia formosana formosana Matsumura, 1911
 クロツバメ沖縄本島亜種  — Histia flabellicornis atrovirens Inoue, 1992
 クロツバメ八重山亜種  — Histia flabellicornis azurea Inoue, 1992
 クロツバメ奄美亜種  — Histia flabellicornis obsoleta Inoue, 1992
 ウスバツバメガ  — Elcysma westwoodii westwoodii (Vollenhoven, 1863)
 ミノウスバ  — Pryeria sinica Moore, 1877
 ベニモンマダラ北海道亜種  — Zygaena niphona hakodatensis Inoue, 1982
 ベニモンマダラ本州亜種  — Zygaena niphona niphona Butler, 1877

Brachodidae
 ニシキヒロハマキモドキ  — Nigilgia limata anactis Diakonoff, 1982
 ヤエヤマヒロハマキモドキ  — Paranigilgia bushii (Arita, 1980)

Sesiidae
 ムナブトヒメスカシバ  — Trichocerota constricta (Butler, 1878)
 エサキヒメスカシバ  — Trichocerota esakii (Yano, 1960)
 ヤクシマヒメスカシバ  — Trichocerota yakushimaensis Arita, 1993
 シラホシヒメスカシバ  — Paranthrenopsis editha (Butler, 1878)
 セスジスカシバ北海道亜種  — Pennisetia fixseni admirabilis Arita, 1992
 セスジスカシバ本州以南亜種  — Pennisetia fixseni fixseni (Leech, [1889])
 ヒメセスジスカシバ  — Pennisetia hylaeiformis assimilis Arita, 1992
 ミナミセスジスカシバ  — Pennisetia insulicola Arita, 1992
 コシボソスカシバ  — Milisipepsis takizawai (Arita & Špatenka, 1989)
 オキナワスカシバ  — Scasiba okinawana (Matsumura, 1931)
 カシワスカシバ  — Scasiba rhynchioides (Butler, 1881)
 コシアカスカシバ  — Scasiba scribai (Bartel, 1912)
 キタスカシバ  — Sesia yezoensis (Hampson, 1919)
 タイワンモモブトスカシバ  — Melittia formosana Matsumura, 1911
 シタキモモブトスカシバ  — Melittia inouei Arita & Yata, 1987
 ルリオオモモブトスカシバ  — Melittia nagaii Arita & Gorbunov, 1997
 オオモモブトスカシバ本土亜種  — Melittia sangaica nipponica Arita & Yata, 1987
 オオモモブトスカシバ八重山亜種  — Melittia sangaica sangaica Moore, 1877
 モモブトスカシバ  — Macroscelesia japona (Hampson, 1919)
 アシナガモモブトスカシバ  — Macroscelesia longipes yamatoensis Arita, 1992
 キクビスカシバ  — Nokona feralis (Leech, [1889])
 ヒメアトスカシバ  — Nokona pernix (Leech, [1889])
 ムラサキスカシバ  — Nokona purpurea (Yano, 1965)
 ブドウスカシバ  — Nokona regalis (Butler, 1878)
 アカスカシバ  — Nokona rubra Arita & Tosevski, 1992
 ビロードスカシバ  — Paranthrene tabaniformis tabaniformis (Rottemburg, 1775)
 ハチマガイスカシバ  — Toleria contaminata (Butler, 1878)
 クビアカスカシバ  — Toleria romanovi (Leech, [1889])
 キコスカシバ  — Synanthedon esperi Špatenka & Arita, 1992
 アカオビコスカシバ  — Synanthedon formicaeformis (Esper, 1783)
 フクズミコスカシバ  — Synanthedon fukuzumii Špatenka & Arita, 1992
 コスカシバ  — Synanthedon hector (Butler, 1878)
 ヒトスジコスカシバ  — Synanthedon multitarsus Špatenka & Arita, 1992
 フタスジコスカシバ  — Synanthedon pseudoscoliaeformis Špatenka & Arita, 1992
 カシコスカシバ  — Synanthedon quercus (Matsumura, 1911)
 フトモンコスカシバ  — Synanthedon scoliaeformis japonica Špatenka & Arita, 1992
 ヤマコスカシバ  — Synanthedon subproducta Inoue, 1982
 ヒメコスカシバ  — Synanthedon tenuis (Butler, 1878)
 スグリコスカシバ  — Synanthedon tipuliformis (Clerck, 1759)
 キオビコスカシバ  — Synanthedon unocingulata Bartel, 1912
 ヤノコスカシバ  — Synanthedon yanoi Špatenka & Arita, 1992
 ミスジコスカシバ  — Scalarignathia montis (Leech, [1889])

Cossidae
 オオボクトウ  — Cossus cossus orientalis Gaede, 1929
 ヒメボクトウ  — Cossus insularis (Staudinger, 1892)
 ボクトウガ  — Cossus jezoensis (Matsumura, 1931)
 クロシオゴマフボクトウ  — Zeuzera caudata rhabdota Jordan, 1932
 コーヒーゴマフボクトウ  — Zeuzera coffeae Nietner, 1861
 ゴマフボクトウ  — Zeuzera multistrigata leuconota Butler, 1881
 ハイイロボクトウ  — Phragmataecia castaneae (Hübner, 1790)

Tortricidae
 ヒロバビロードハマキ  — Eurydoxa advena Filipjev, 1930
 ニセビロードハマキ  — Cerace onustana Walker, 1863
 ビロードハマキ  — Cerace xanthocosma Diakonoff, 1950
 ウストビハマキ  — Pandemis chlorograpta Meyrick, 1931
 アカトビハマキ  — Pandemis cinnamomeana (Treitschke, 1830)
 ウスアミメトビハマキ  — Pandemis corylana (Fabricius, 1794)
 スジトビハマキ  — Pandemis dumetana (Treitschke, 1835)
 トビハマキ  — Pandemis heparana ([Denis & Schiffermüller], 1775)
 オビグロハマキ  — Pandemis ignescana (Kuznetzov, 1976)
 ヤマトビハマキ  — Pandemis monticolana Yasuda, 1975
 クロタテスジハマキ  — Archips abiephaga (Yasuda, 1975)
 アトキハマキ  — Archips audax Razowski, 1977
 コアトキハマキ  — Archips betulana betulana (Hübner, [1787])
 リンゴモンハマキ  — Archips breviplicana Walsingham, 1900
 カタカケハマキ  — Archips capsigerana (Kennel, 1901)
 クロカクモンハマキ  — Archips endoi Yasuda, 1975
 イチイオオハマキ  — Archips fumosa Kodama, 1960
 ミダレカクモンハマキ  — Archips fuscocupreana Walsingham, 1900
 オオアトキハマキ  — Archips ingentana (Christoph, 1881)
 チビカクモンハマキ  — Archips insulana (Kawabe, 1965)
 モミアトキハマキ  — Archips issikii Kodama, 1960
 リュウキュウアトキハマキ  — Archips meridionalis Yasuda & Kawabe, 1980
 シリグロハマキ  — Archips nigricaudana (Walsingham, 1900)
 マツアトキハマキ  — Archips oporana (Linnaeus, 1758)
 クロシオハマキ  — Archips peratrata Yasuda, 1961
 タテスジハマキ  — Archips pulchra (Butler, 1879)
 ウスアトキハマキ  — Archips semistructa (Meyrick, 1937)
 ナガレボシハマキ  — Archips stellata Jinbo, 2006
 ヒナタハマキ  — Archips subrufana (Snellen, 1883)
 ムラサキカクモンハマキ  — Archips viola Falkovitsh, 1965
 カクモンハマキ  — Archips xylosteana (Linnaeus, 1758)
 リンゴオオハマキ  — Choristoneura adumbratana (Walsingham, 1900)
 コスジオビハマキ  — Choristoneura diversana (Hübner, [1817])
 モミコスジオビハマキ  — Choristoneura jezoensis Yasuda & Suzuki, 1987
 ウスキカクモンハマキ  — Choristoneura lafauryana (Ragonot, 1875)
 アトボシハマキ  — Choristoneura longicellana (Walsingham, 1900)
 スギハマキ  — Homona issikii Yasuda, 1962
 チャハマキ  — Homona magnanima Diakonoff, 1948
 ハイトビスジハマキ  — Syndemis musculana nipponensis Yasuda, 1975
 ミヤマヒロバハマキ  — Aphelia christophi Obraztsov, 1968
 カゲハマキ  — Aphelia inumbratana (Christoph, 1881)
 和名未定  — Aphelia paleana (Hübner, 1793)
 リシリハマキ  — Aphelia septentrionalis Obraztsov, 1959
 和名未定  — Aphelia viburnana ([Denis & Schiffermüller], 1775)
 トウヒオオハマキ  — Lozotaenia coniferana (Issiki, 1961)
 コスギハマキ  — Lozotaenia forsterana (Fabricius, 1781)
 タカネハマキ  — Lozotaenia kumatai Oku, 1963
 カラマツイトヒキハマキ  — Ptycholomoides aeriferana (Herrich-Schäffer, 1851)
 アミメキハマキ  — Ptycholoma imitator (Walsingham, 1900)
 オオギンスジハマキ  — Ptycholoma lecheanum circumclusanum (Christoph, 1881)
 カバスジハマキ  — Tosirips perpulchranus ceramus Razowski, 1987
 ミヤマキハマキ  — Clepsis aliana Kawabe, 1965
 ダイセツチビハマキ  — Clepsis insignata Oku, 1963
 タカネベニハマキ  — Clepsis jinboi Kawabe, 1965
 タカネハイイロハマキ  — Clepsis monticolana Kawabe, 1964
 アカスジキイロハマキ  — Clepsis pallidana (Fabricius, 1776)
 ウスモンハマキ  — Clepsis rurinana (Linnaeus, 1758)
 ウスコカクモンハマキ  — Adoxophyes dubia Yasuda, 1998
 チャノコカクモンハマキ  — Adoxophyes honmai Yasuda, 1988
 リンゴコカクモンハマキ  — Adoxophyes orana fasciata Walsingham, 1900
 オオハイジロハマキ  — Pseudeulia asinana (Hübner, [1799])
 ハイジロハマキ  — Pseudeulia vermicularis (Meyrick, 1935)
 ツヅリモンハマキ  — Homonopsis foederatana (Kennel, 1901)
 ツヤスジハマキ  — Homonopsis illotana (Kennel, 1901)
 オクハマキ  — Dentisociaria armata okui Yasuda, 1975
 アセビコハマキ  — Daemilus fulvus (Filipjev, 1962)
 ムツウラハマキ  — Daemilus mutuurai Yasuda, 1975
 リュウキュウハマキ  — Neocalyptis affinisana (Walker, 1863)
 コホソスジハマキ  — Neocalyptis angustilineata (Walsingham, 1900)
 トビモンコハマキ  — Neocalyptis congruentana (Kennel, 1901)
 ウストビモンハマキ  — Neocalyptis lacernata (Yasuda, 1975)
 フタモンコハマキ  — Neocalyptis liratana (Christoph, 1881)
 ニセトビモンコハマキ  — Neocalyptis nigricana (Yasuda, 1975)
 ハイイロウスモンハマキ  — Capua vulgana (Frölich, 1828)
 ミヤマオビハマキ  — Geogepa monticola Jinbo, 2004
 ホシオビハマキ  — Geogepa stenochorda (Diakonoff, 1948)
 リュウキュウトビモンハマキ  — Gnorismoneura exulis Issiki & Stringer, 1932
 ホシノハマキ  — Gnorismoneura hoshinoi (Kawabe, 1964)
 トビモンハマキ  — Gnorismoneura mesotoma (Yasuda, 1975)
 ケバネハマキ  — Gnorismoneura vallifica (Meyrick, 1935)
 クシヒゲムラサキハマキ  — Terricula violetana (Kawabe, 1964)
 コギンボシハマキ  — Drachmobola periastra Meyrick, 1907
 マダラギンスジハマキ  — Pseudargyrotoza conwagana aeratana (Kennel, 1910)
 アオスジキハマキ  — Dicanticinta diticinctana (Walsingham, 1900)
 ニセヒロバキハマキ  — Minutargyrotoza calvicaput (Walsingham, 1900)
 ヒロバキハマキ  — Minutargyrotoza minuta (Walsingham, 1900)
 和名未定  — Protopterna eremia Yasuda & Razowski, 1991
 和名未定  — Eulia dryonephela Meyrick, 1932
 ボカシハマキ  — Eulia ministrana (Linnaeus, 1758)
 ホソバハイイロハマキ  — Cnephasia stephensiana stolidana (Walker, 1863)
 ギンムジハマキ  — Eana argentana (Clerck, 1759)
 キタハイイロハマキ  — Eana incanana (Stephens, 1852)
 ヨモギゴマフハマキ  — Eana vetulana (Christoph, 1881)
 ウスオビハイイロフユハマキ  — Kawabeia ignavana (Christoph, 1881)
 ウスグロフユハマキ  — Kawabeia nigricolor Yasuda & Kawabe, 1980
 ハイイロフユハマキ  — Kawabeia razowskii (Kawabe, 1963)
 ヤチダモハマキ  — Doloploca praeviella Erschoff, 1877
 モミヨコスジハマキ  — Paracroesia abievora (Issiki, 1961)
 ギンボシトビハマキ  — Spatalistis christophana (Walsingham, 1900)
 ギンスジクロハマキ  — Spatalistis egesta Razowski, 1974
 スジマルバハマキ  — Paratorna catenulella (Christoph, 1882)
 ミスジマルバハマキ  — Paratorna cuprescens Falkovitsh, 1965
 ホノホハマキ  — Acleris aestuosa Yasuda, 1965
 プライヤハマキ  — Acleris affinatana (Snellen, 1883)
 ニセヤナギハマキ  — Acleris albiscapulana (Christoph, 1881)
 ハンノキミダレモンハマキ  — Acleris alnivora Oku, 1956
 オオウスアオハマキ  — Acleris amurensis (Caradja, 1928)
 チャモンギンハマキ  — Acleris arcuata (Yasuda, 1975)
 ギンスジカバハマキ  — Acleris askoldana (Christoph, 1881)
 ウンモンキハマキ  — Acleris aurichalcana (Bremer, 1865)
 マエアカハマキ  — Acleris bicolor Kawabe, 1963
 ツマグロギンハマキ  — Acleris blanda (Yasuda, 1975)
 キボシエグリハマキ  — Acleris caerulescens (Walsingham, 1900)
 バラモンハマキ  — Acleris comariana (Lienig & Zeller, 1846)
 ネウスハマキ  — Acleris conchyloides (Walsingham, 1900)
 シロウマハマキ  — Acleris crassa Razowski & Yasuda, 1964
 クロトラフハマキ  — Acleris crataegi (Kuznetzov, 1964)
 トサカハマキ  — Acleris cristana ([Denis & Schiffermüller], 1775)
 シロオビギンハマキ  — Acleris dealbata (Yasuda, 1975)
 ギンミスジハマキ  — Acleris delicata (Yasuda & Kawabe, 1980)
 コトサカハマキ  — Acleris delicatana (Christoph, 1881)
 ニセウンモンキハマキ  — Acleris dentata (Razowski, 1966)
 ホシギンスジキハマキ  — Acleris elegans Oku, 1956
 エグリハマキ  — Acleris emargana emargana (Fabricius, 1775)
 セウスイロハマキ  — Acleris enitescens (Meyrick, 1912)
 モンウスイロハマキ  — Acleris expressa (Filipjev, 1931)
 ウツギアミメハマキ  — Acleris exsucana (Kennel, 1901)
 コウスアオハマキ  — Acleris filipjevi Obraztsov, 1956
 モトキハマキ  — Acleris fuscotogata (Walsingham, 1900)
 チャオビハマキ  — Acleris hastiana (Linnaeus, 1758)
 ハイミダレモンハマキ  — Acleris hispidana (Christoph, 1881)
 キタハマキ  — Acleris hokkaidana Razowski & Yasuda, 1964
 ホソマダラハイイロハマキ  — Acleris indignana (Christoph, 1881)
 スジエグリハマキ  — Acleris issikii Oku, 1957
 ナカジロハマキ  — Acleris japonica (Walsingham, 1900)
 コダマハマキ  — Acleris kodamai Yasuda, 1965
 マエモンシロハマキ  — Acleris lacordairana (Duponchel, 1836)
 ヤナギハマキ  — Acleris laterana (Fabricius, 1794)
 ギンヨスジハマキ  — Acleris leechi (Walsingham, 1900)
 ウスジロハマキ  — Acleris logiana (Clerck, 1759)
 ゴマフテングハマキ  — Acleris longipalpana (Snellen, 1883)
 ナカタニハマキ  — Acleris maccana (Treitschke, 1835)
 スジグロハマキ  — Acleris nigrilineana Kawabe, 1963
 ネグロハマキ  — Acleris nigriradix (Filipjev, 1931)
 コガシラハマキ  — Acleris ophthalmicana Razowski & Yasuda, 1964
 ツマモンエグリハマキ  — Acleris paradiseana (Walsingham, 1900)
 ナラコハマキ  — Acleris perfundana Kuznetzov, 1962
 ウスギンスジキハマキ  — Acleris phalera (Kuznetzov, 1964)
 アカネハマキ  — Acleris phantastica Razowski & Yasuda, 1964
 チャモンシロハマキ  — Acleris placata (Meyrick, 1912)
 ウスモンオオハマキ  — Acleris placida Yasuda & Kawabe, 1980
 フタスジクリイロハマキ  — Acleris platynotana (Walsingham, 1900)
 マエキハマキ  — Acleris pulchella Kawabe, 1964
 ニセウスギンスジキハマキ  — Acleris razowskii (Yasuda, 1975)
 ゴマフミダレハマキ  — Acleris rufana ([Denis & Schiffermüller], 1775)
 シロオビハマキ  — Acleris salicicola Kuznetzov, 1970
 コアミメチャハマキ  — Acleris shepherdana (Stephens, 1852)
 ウスモンハイイロハマキ  — Acleris similis (Filipjev, 1931)
 ウスアオハマキ  — Acleris strigifera (Filipjev, 1931)
 ミヤマミダレモンハマキ  — Acleris submaccana (Filipjev, 1962)
 ヒメサザナミハマキ  — Acleris takeuchii Razowski & Yasuda, 1964
 トラフハマキ  — Acleris tigricolor (Walsingham, 1900)
 クロコハマキ  — Acleris tunicatana (Walsingham, 1900)
 ニレハマキ  — Acleris ulmicola (Meyrick, 1930)
 ヒカゲハマキ  — Acleris umbrana (Hübner, [1799])
 ウスオビチャイロハマキ  — Acleris uniformis (Filipjev, 1931)
 ヨコヒダハマキ  — Acleris yasudai Razowski, 1966
 和名未定  — Tortrix punctana Motschulsky, 1866
 和名未定  — Tortrix rubicana Motschulsky, 1866
 ウスアミメキハマキ  — Tortrix sinapina (Butler, 1879)
 アミメテングハマキ  — Sparganothis illustris Razowski, 1975
 カキノテングハマキ  — Sparganothis matsudai Yasuda, 1975
 テングハマキ  — Sparganothis pilleriana ([Denis & Schiffermüller], 1775)
 フタテンホソハマキ  — Phtheochroa inopiana (Haworth, [1811])
 和名未定  — Phtheochroa issikii (Razowski, 1977)
 セジロホソハマキ  — Phtheochroa pistrinana (Erschoff, 1877)
 オオムナグロホソハマキ  — Phtheochroa pulvillana (Herrich-Schäffer, 1851)
 オオウンモンホソハマキ  — Phtheochroa vulneratana (Zetterstedt, 1840)
 ホソバホソハマキ  — Cochylimorpha amabilis (Meyrick, 1931)
 クサビホソハマキ  — Cochylimorpha jaculana (Snellen, 1883)
 ウスキホソハマキ  — Cochylimorpha nipponana (Razowski, 1977)
 ウスモンコホソハマキ  — Gynnidomorpha alismana (Ragonot, 1883)
 和名未定  — Gynnidomorpha luridana (Gregson, 1870)
 ミニホソハマキ  — Gynnidomorpha minimana (Caradja, 1916)
 チビホソハマキ  — Gynnidomorpha permixtana ([Denis & Schiffermüller], 1775)
 リンドウホソハマキ  — Gynnidomorpha rubricana (Peyerimhoff, 1877)
 コホソハマキ  — Gynnidomorpha vectisana (Humphreys & Westwood, 1845)
 ミダレモンホソハマキ  — Phalonidia aliena Kuznetzov, 1966
 アミメホソハマキ  — Phalonidia chlorolitha (Meyrick, 1931)
 ニセフトオビホソハマキ  — Phalonidia curvistrigana (Stainton, 1859)
 コホソオビホソハマキ  — Phalonidia lydiae (Filipjev, 1940)
 コナカオビホソハマキ  — Phalonidia manniana (Fischer von Röslerstamm, 1839)
 コエダオビホソハマキ  — Phalonidia melanothica (Meyrick, 1927)
 クワイホソハマキ  — Phalonidia mesotypa Razowski, 1970
 クロミニホソハマキ  — Phalonidia parvana Kawabe, 1980
 フトオビホソハマキ  — Phalonidia latifasciana Razowski, 1970
 ツマオビシロホソハマキ  — Phalonidia zygota Razowski, 1964
 ツマオビホソハマキ  — Phtheochroides apicana (Walsingham, 1900)
 ヨモギオオホソハマキ  — Phtheochroides clandestina Razowski, 1968
 ギンモンホソハマキ  — Eugnosta dives (Butler, 1878)
 ツマオビセンモンホソハマキ  — Eugnosta ussuriana (Caradja, 1926)
 ニセエダオビホソハマキ  — Aethes cnicana cnicana (Westwood, 1854)
 ダイセツホソハマキ  — Aethes deutschiana (Zetterstedt, 1840)
 チャモンキホソハマキ  — Aethes hoenei Razowski, 1964
 フタスジキホソハマキ  — Aethes rectilineana (Caradja, 1939)
 エダオビホソハマキ  — Aethes rubigana (Treitschke, 1830)
 ミヤマコホソハマキ  — Aethes rutilana rutilana (Hübner, [1817])
 和名未定  — Aethes smeathmanniana (Fabricius, 1781)
 ツマギンスジナガバホソハマキ  — Aethes triangulana excellentana (Christoph, 1881)
 ブドウホソハマキ  — Eupoecilia ambiguella (Hübner, [1796])
 ツマオビキホソハマキ  — Eupoecilia angustana (Hübner, [1799])
 フタオビホソハマキ  — Eupoecilia citrinana Razowski, 1960
 イノウエホソハマキ  — Eupoecilia inouei Kawabe, 1972
 アカオビホソハマキ  — Eupoecilia kobeana Razowski, 1968
 フトハスジホソハマキ  — Cochylidia contumescens (Meyrick, 1931)
 ハスジチビホソハマキ  — Cochylidia heydeniana (Herrich-Schäffer, 1851)
 ヨモギウストビホソハマキ  — Cochylidia richteriana (Fischer von Röslerstamm, 1837)
 ナカハスジベニホソハマキ  — Cochylidia subroseana (Haworth, [1811])
 トガリホソハマキ  — Cochylis hybridella (Hübner, [1810-1813])
 ネグロホソハマキ  — Cochylis nana (Haworth, [1811])
 ハラブトヒメハマキ  — Cryptaspasma angulicostana (Walsingham, 1900)
 ヘリオビヒメハマキ  — Cryptaspasma marginifasciata (Walsingham, 1900)
 クロサンカクモンヒメハマキ  — Cryptaspasma trigonana (Walsingham, 1900)
 キモントガリバヒメハマキ  — Bactra cerata cerata (Meyrick, 1909)
 和名未定  — Bactra copidotis Meyrick, 1909
 トガリバヒメハマキ  — Bactra festa Diakonoff, 1959
 イグサヒメハマキ  — Bactra furfurana (Haworth, [1811])
 フタモントガリバヒメハマキ  — Bactra hostilis Diakonoff, 1956
 和名未定  — Bactra lacteana Caradja, 1916
 ウキヤガラシンムシガ  — Bactra robustana (Christoph, 1872)
 シロテントガリバヒメハマキ  — Bactra venosana (Zeller, 1847)
 ギンボシクロヒメハマキ  — Hiroshiinoueana stellifera Kawabe, 1978
 シロテンアカマダラヒメハマキ  — Gatesclarkeana idia Diakonoff, 1973
 サッポロヒメハマキ  — Ukamenia sapporensis (Matsumura, 1931)
 オオクロマダラヒメハマキ  — Endothenia atrata (Caradja, 1926)
 ウンモンクロマダラヒメハマキ  — Endothenia austerana (Kennel, 1916)
 ニセコクロヒメハマキ  — Endothenia bira Kawabe, 1976
 和名未定  — Endothenia ericetana (Humphreys & Westwood, 1845)
 ツマジロクロヒメハマキ  — Endothenia gentianaeana (Hübner, [1799])
 キヨサトヒメハマキ  — Endothenia habesana (Walker, 1863)
 カワラクロマダラヒメハマキ  — Endothenia informalis (Meyrick, 1935)
 ホソクロマダラヒメハマキ  — Endothenia ingrata Falkovitsh, 1970
 ハッカノネムシガ  — Endothenia menthivora (Oku, [1963])
 クロマダラシンムシガ  — Endothenia nigricostana (Haworth, [1811])
 ニセハッカノネムシガ  — Endothenia quadrimaculana (Haworth, [1811])
 コクロヒメハマキ  — Endothenia remigera Falkovitsh, 1970
 ヤクサザナミキヒメハマキ  — Tokuana imbrica Kawabe, 1978
 ミナミヒメハマキ  — Rhodocosmaria occidentalis Diakonoff, 1973
 ヘリグロヒメハマキ  — Orientophiaris altissima (Kawabe, 1978)
 タブノヒメハマキ  — Sorolopha plinthograpta (Meyrick, 1931)
 ハスオビヒメハマキ  — Sorolopha sphaerocopa (Meyrick, 1930)
 ツマモンヒメハマキ  — Eudemopsis kirishimensis Kawabe, 1974
 マエジロムラサキヒメハマキ  — Eudemopsis pompholycias (Meyrick, 1935)
 ツマモンベニヒメハマキ  — Eudemopsis purpurissatana (Kennel, 1901)
 コツマモンベニヒメハマキ  — Eudemopsis tokui Kawabe, 1974
 ニセツマモンベニヒメハマキ  — Eudemopsis toshimai Kawabe, 1974
 ツママルモンヒメハマキ  — Eudemis brevisetosa Oku, 2005
 ヤマモモヒメハマキ  — Eudemis gyrotis (Meyrick, 1900)
 ナカグロマルモンヒメハマキ  — Eudemis lucida Liu & Bai, 1982
 サクラマルモンヒメハマキ  — Eudemis porphyrana (Hübner, [1799])
 和名未定  — Phaecasiophora attica (Meyrick, 1907)
 オオシロアシヒメハマキ  — Phaecasiophora fernaldana Walsingham, 1900
 シロテンシロアシヒメハマキ  — Phaecasiophora obraztsovi Diakonoff, 1973
 ツマベニヒメハマキ  — Phaecasiophora roseana (Walsingham, 1900)
 コモンアシブトヒメハマキ  — Psilacantha pryeri (Walsingham, 1900)
 スジオビヒメハマキ  — Dactylioglypha tonica (Meyrick, 1909)
 シロモンアカヒメハマキ  — Statherotoxys hedraea (Meyrick, 1905)
 オジロモンヒメハマキ  — Cephalophyes cyanura (Meyrick, 1909)
 レイシヒメハマキ  — Statherotis discana (Felder & Rogenhofer, 1875)
 オオヒロオビヒメハマキ  — Statherotis towadaensis Kawabe, 1978
 オガタマヒメハマキ  — Arcesis threnodes (Meyrick, 1905)
 コブシヒメハマキ  — Neostatherotis nipponica Oku, 1974
 ヒロバクロヒメハマキ  — Proschistis marmaropa (Meyrick, 1907)
 シモフリヒメハマキ  — Rhodacra pyrrhocrossa (Meyrick, 1912)
 キモンヒメハマキ  — Statherotmantis pictana (Kuznetzov, 1969)
 コシロモンヒメハマキ  — Statherotmantis shicotana (Kuznetzov, 1969)
 ツシマツマキヒメハマキ  — Aterpia bicolor Kawabe, 1978
 和名未定  — Aterpia chalybeia Falkovitsh, 1966
 サカモンヒメハマキ  — Aterpia circumfluxana (Christoph, 1881)
 オカトラノオヒメハマキ  — Aterpia flavipunctana (Christoph, 1881)
 イッシキヒメハマキ  — Aterpia issikii Kawabe, 1980
 ナカジロヒメハマキ  — Aterpia praeceps (Meyrick, 1909)
 ネジロクロヒメハマキ  — Aterpia semnodryas (Meyrick, 1936)
 和名未定  — Neopotamia divisa (Walsingham, 1900)
 和名未定  — Neopotamia ochracea (Walsingham, 1900)
 ミダレモンヒメハマキ  — Phaecadophora acutana Walsingham, 1900
 スネブトヒメハマキ  — Phaecadophora fimbriata Walsingham, 1900
 モザイクヒメハマキ  — Temnolopha mosaica (Lower, 1901)
 ヤナギサザナミヒメハマキ  — Saliciphaga acharis (Butler, 1879)
 オオヤナギサザナミヒメハマキ  — Saliciphaga caesia Falkovitsh, 1962
 ドロヒメハマキ  — Pseudosciaphila branderiana (Linnaeus, 1758)
 オオセンダンヒメハマキ  — Dudua aprobola (Meyrick, 1886)
 カンコヒメハマキ  — Dudua charadraea (Meyrick, 1909)
 ホソウンモンヒメハマキ  — Dudua hemigrapta (Meyrick, 1931)
 和名未定  — Dudua scaeaspis (Meyrick, 1937)
 コシロアシヒメハマキ  — Hystrichoscelus spathanum Walsingham, 1900
 タテスジヒメハマキ  — Hedya anaplecta (Meyrick, 1909)
 グミオオウスツマヒメハマキ  — Hedya auricristana (Walsingham, 1900)
 ヤマボウシヒメハマキ  — Hedya corni Oku, 1974
 和名未定  — Hedya designata (Kuznetzov, 1970)
 シロモンヒメハマキ  — Hedya dimidiana (Clerck, 1759)
 カンコノスジヒメハマキ  — Hedya gratiana Kawabe, 1974
 ニセシロモンヒメハマキ  — Hedya ignara Falkovitsh, 1962
 オオサザナミヒメハマキ  — Hedya inornata (Walsingham, 1900)
 カタシロムラサキヒメハマキ  — Hedya iophaea (Meyrick, 1912)
 シベチャツマジロヒメハマキ  — Hedya ochroleucana (Frölich, 1828)
 和名未定  — Hedya salicella (Linnaeus, 1758)
 オオウスヅマヒメハマキ  — Hedya semiassana (Kennel, 1901)
 ナガウスツマヒメハマキ  — Hedya simulans Oku, 2005
 ツシマクロヒメハマキ  — Hedya tsushimaensis Kawabe, 1978
 シラフオオヒメハマキ  — Hedya vicinana (Ragonot, 1894)
 バラギンオビヒメハマキ  — Hedya walsinghami Oku, 1974
 ツマキオオヒメハマキ  — Pseudohedya cincinna Falkovitsh, 1962
 ハイナミスジキヒメハマキ  — Pseudohedya dentata Oku, 2005
 ナカオビナミスジキヒメハマキ  — Pseudohedya gradana (Christoph, 1881)
 ニセギンボシモトキヒメハマキ  — Pseudohedya plumbosana (Kawabe, 1972)
 オオナミスジキヒメハマキ  — Pseudohedya retracta Falkovitsh, 1962
 サトウヒメハマキ  — Pseudohedya satoi Kawabe, 1978
 ガレモンヒメハマキ  — Zeiraphera argutana (Christoph, 1881)
 セギンモンヒメハマキ  — Zeiraphera bicolora Kawabe, 1976
 クロモンミズアオヒメハマキ  — Zeiraphera caeruleumana Kawabe, 1980
 ハシドイヒメハマキ  — Zeiraphera corpulentana (Kennel, 1901)
 シロマルモンヒメハマキ  — Zeiraphera demutata (Walsingham, 1900)
 ニセミドリヒメハマキ  — Zeiraphera fulvomixtana Kawabe, 1974
 ハイイロアミメヒメハマキ  — Zeiraphera griseana (Hübner, [1799])
 ヒロシヒメハマキ  — Zeiraphera hiroshii Kawabe, 1980
 カラマツチャイロヒメハマキ  — Zeiraphera lariciana Kawabe, 1980
 アサヒヒメハマキ  — Zeiraphera luciferana Kawabe, 1980
 和名未定  — Zeiraphera ratzeburgiana (Saxesen, 1840)
 トドマツアミメヒメハマキ  — Zeiraphera rufimitrana truncata Oku, 1968
 マエジロミドリモンヒメハマキ  — Zeiraphera shimekii Kawabe, 1974
 ミドリモンヒメハマキ  — Zeiraphera subcorticana (Snellen, 1883)
 コエゾマツアミメヒメハマキ  — Zeiraphera suzukii Oku, 1968
 ミドリヒメハマキ  — Zeiraphera virinea Falkovitsh, 1965
 クロテンツマキヒメハマキ  — Metendothenia atropunctana (Zetterstedt, 1839)
 ニセクロテンツマキヒメハマキ  — Metendothenia inouei Kawabe, 1987
 ツゲモドキヒメハマキ  — Metendothenia mesarotra (Meyrick, 1911)
 オガサワラヒメハマキ  — Metendothenia ogasawarensis Kawabe & Kusui, 1978
 ネホシウスツマヒメハマキ  — Apotomis basipunctana (Walsingham, 1900)
 ツマジロヒメハマキ  — Apotomis betuletana (Haworth, [1811])
 チャオビヒメハマキ  — Apotomis biemina Kawabe, 1980
 ヤナギツマジロヒメハマキ  — Apotomis capreana (Hübner, [1817])
 チャモンヒメハマキ  — Apotomis cuphostra (Butler, 1879)
 キオビヒメハマキ  — Apotomis flavifasciana (Kawabe, 1976)
 グミツマジロヒメハマキ  — Apotomis geminata (Walsingham, 1900)
 ナカグロツマジロヒメハマキ  — Apotomis jucundana Kawabe, 1984
 カワベタカネヒメハマキ  — Apotomis kusunokii Kawabe, 1993
 グミウスツマヒメハマキ  — Apotomis lacteifascies (Walsingham, 1900)
 エゾツマジロヒメハマキ  — Apotomis lineana ([Denis & Schiffermüller], 1775)
 ニセネジロクロヒメハマキ  — Apotomis platycremna (Meyrick, 1935)
 スノキツマジロヒメハマキ  — Apotomis vaccinii Kuznetzov, 1969
 キタツマジロヒメハマキ  — Apotomis vigens Falkovitsh, 1966
 トウヒヒメハマキ  — Cymolomia hartigiana (Saxesen, 1840)
 イソツツジノメムシガ  — Argyroploce lediana (Linnaeus, 1758)
 コシモフリヒメハマキ  — Selenodes concretana (Wocke, 1862)
 和名未定  — Olethreutes acropryeranus (Bae, 2000)
 シモツケチャイロヒメハマキ  — Olethreutes avianus (Falkovitsh, 1959)
 シロマダラヒメハマキ  — Olethreutes bipunctanus yama (Kawabe, 1974)
 ツヤスジウンモンヒメハマキ  — Olethreutes cacuminanus (Kennel, 1901)
 モンギンスジヒメハマキ  — Olethreutes captiosanus (Falkovitsh, 1960)
 クリイロヒメハマキ  — Olethreutes castaneanus (Walsingham, 1900)
 スギゴケヒメハマキ  — Olethreutes dissolutanus (Stange, 1886)
 ウスクリモンヒメハマキ  — Olethreutes dolosanus (Kennel, 1901)
 クローバヒメハマキ  — Olethreutes doubledayanus (Barret, 1872)
 ウツギヒメハマキ  — Olethreutes electanus (Kennel, 1901)
 オオツヤスジウンモンヒメハマキ  — Olethreutes examinatus (Falkovitsh, 1966)
 マダラチビヒメハマキ  — Olethreutes exilis Falkovitsh, 1966
 アミメヒメハマキ  — Olethreutes fasciatanus (Clemens, 1860)
 ガンコウランヒメハマキ  — Olethreutes hokkaidanus (Bae, 2000)
 キオビキマダラヒメハマキ  — Olethreutes humeralis (Walsingham, 1900)
 イヌエンジュヒメハマキ  — Olethreutes ineptanus (Kennel, 1901)
 マノヒメハマキ  — Olethreutes manoi (Kawabe, 1987)
 ホソギンスジヒメハマキ  — Olethreutes metallicanus bicornutanus (Kuznetzov, 1971)
 和名未定  — Olethreutes milichopis (Meyrick, 1931)
 ナツハゼヒメハマキ  — Olethreutes moderatus (Falkovitsh, 1962)
 クワヒメハマキ  — Olethreutes mori (Matsumura, 1900)
 コクワヒメハマキ  — Olethreutes morivorus (Matsumura, 1900)
 クリオビキヒメハマキ  — Olethreutes obovatus (Walsingham, 1900)
 カゲマダラヒメハマキ  — Olethreutes opacalis (Bae, 2000)
 コクリオビクロヒメハマキ  — Olethreutes orthocosma (Meyrick, 1931)
 キスジオビヒメハマキ  — Olethreutes pryeranus (Walsingham, 1900)
 タカネナガバヒメハマキ  — Olethreutes schulzianus (Fabricius, 1777)
 ウワミズヒメハマキ  — Olethreutes semicremanus (Christoph, 1881)
 ギンボシモトキヒメハマキ  — Olethreutes sideranus (Treitschke, 1835)
 ナミスジキヒメハマキ  — Olethreutes subretractus (Kawabe, 1976)
 コモンギンスジヒメハマキ  — Olethreutes subtilanus (Falkovitsh, 1959)
 トドマツハイモンヒメハマキ  — Olethreutes tephreus (Falkovitsh, 1966)
 ミヤマキマダラヒメハマキ  — Olethreutes toshiookui (Bae, 2000)
 オオクリモンヒメハマキ  — Olethreutes transversanus (Christoph, 1881)
 ツタキオビヒメハマキ  — Olethreutes tsutavorus (Oku, 1971)
 ウシタキキオビヒメハマキ  — Phiaris komaii Bae, 2005
 和名未定  — Rudisociaria expeditana (Snellen, 1883)
 クリオビクロヒメハマキ  — Rudisociaria velutina (Walsingham, 1900)
 ミヤマウンモンヒメハマキ  — Syricoris lacunana ([Denis & Schiffermüller], 1775)
 コケキオビヒメハマキ  — Celypha aurofasciana (Haworth, [1811])
 ウスクリイロヒメハマキ  — Celypha cespitana (Hübner, [1817])
 コウスクリイロヒメハマキ  — Celypha cornigera Oku, 1968
 コキスジオビヒメハマキ  — Celypha flavipalpana (Herrich-Schäffer, 1851)
 ゴトウヅルヒメハマキ  — Celypha hydrangeana (Kuznetzov, 1969)
 和名未定  — Celypha kurilensis Oku, 1965
 ニセウツギヒメハマキ  — Celypha subelectana (Kawabe, 1976)
 キツリフネヒメハマキ  — Pristerognatha fuligana ([Denis & Schiffermüller], 1775)
 キシタヒメハマキ  — Pristerognatha penthinana (Guenée, 1845)
 アミメモンヒメハマキ  — Pseudohermenias abietana (Fabricius, 1787)
 ホソオビアミメモンヒメハマキ  — Pseudohermenias ajaensis Falkovitsh, 1966
 アカマツハナムシガ  — Piniphila bifasciana (Haworth, [1811])
 ミヤマツヤスジウンモンヒメハマキ  — Orthotaenia secunda Falkovitsh, 1962
 イラクサヒメハマキ  — Orthotaenia undulana ([Denis & Schiffermüller], 1775)
 和名未定  — Capricornia boisduvaliana (Duponchel, 1836)
 アカマダラヒメハマキ  — Ophiorrhabda tokui (Kawabe, 1974)
 ホソバチビヒメハマキ  — Lobesia aeolopa Meyrick, 1907
 ネギホソバヒメハマキ  — Lobesia bicinctana bicinctana (Duponchel, 1842)
 和名未定  — Lobesia candida Diakonoff, 1973
 スイカズラホソバヒメハマキ  — Lobesia coccophaga Falkovitsh, 1970
 和名未定  — Lobesia crimea Falkovitsh, 1970
 トドマツチビヒメハマキ  — Lobesia incystata Liu & Yang, 1987
 和名未定  — Lobesia macroptera Liu & Bae, 1994
 ミエヒメハマキ  — Lobesia mieae Kawabe, 1980
 和名未定  — Lobesia pyriformis Bae & Park, 1992
 ホソバヒメハマキ  — Lobesia reliquana (Hübner, [1776])
 和名未定  — Lobesia takahiroi Bae, 1996
 カラマツホソバヒメハマキ  — Lobesia virulenta virulenta Bae & Komai, 1991
 ハマナスホソバヒメハマキ  — Lobesia yasudai Bae & Komai, 1991
 チャモンサザナミキヒメハマキ  — Neoanathamna cerina Kawabe, 1978
 スジキヒメハマキ  — Neoanathamna negligens Kawabe, 1978
 ニセコシワヒメハマキ  — Neoanathamna nipponica (Kawabe, 1976)
 スソモンサザナミキヒメハマキ  — Neoanathamna pallens Kawabe, 1980
 コナミスジキヒメハマキ  — Tetramoera flammeata (Kuznetzov, 1971)
 カンシャシンクイ  — Tetramoera schistaceana (Snellen, 1891)
 ハイマダラヒメハマキ  — Sillybiphora devia Kuznetzov, 1964
 マゲバヒメハマキ  — Kennelia xylinana (Kennel, 1900)
 マエモンマダラカギバヒメハマキ  — Ancylis amplimacula Falkovitsh, 1965
 タテスジカギバヒメハマキ  — Ancylis apicella ([Denis & Schiffermüller], 1775)
 ツマアカカギバヒメハマキ  — Ancylis apicipicta Oku, 2005
 アキニレカギバヒメハマキ  — Ancylis arcitenens Meyrick, 1922
 セクロモンカギバヒメハマキ  — Ancylis badiana ([Denis & Schiffermüller], 1775)
 和名未定  — Ancylis caudifer Stringer, 1929
 イチゴカギバヒメハマキ  — Ancylis comptana (Frölich, 1828)
 和名未定  — Ancylis corylicolana Kuznetzov, 1962
 ナミモンカギバヒメハマキ  — Ancylis geminana (Donovan, 1806)
 チャモンカギバヒメハマキ  — Ancylis kenneli Kuznetzov, 1962
 マダラカギバヒメハマキ  — Ancylis laetana (Fabricius, 1775)
 オオセモンカギバヒメハマキ  — Ancylis limosa Oku, 2005
 コカギバヒメハマキ  — Ancylis lotkini Kuznetzov, 1969
 セモンカギバヒメハマキ  — Ancylis mandarinana Walsingham, 1900
 クロテンマダラカギバヒメハマキ  — Ancylis melanostigma Kuznetzov, 1970
 ミヤマカギバヒメハマキ  — Ancylis myrtilana myrtilana (Treitschke, 1830)
 カギバヒメハマキ  — Ancylis nemorana Kuznetzov, 1969
 ウススジアカカギバヒメハマキ  — Ancylis obtusana (Haworth, [1811])
 カバカギバヒメハマキ  — Ancylis partitana (Christoph, 1881)
 ナガカギバヒメハマキ  — Ancylis repandana Kennel, 1901
 ナツメカギバヒメハマキ  — Ancylis sativa Liu, 1979
 フタボシヒメハマキ  — Ancylis selenana (Guenée, 1845)
 ウスベニカギバヒメハマキ  — Ancylis uncella ([Denis & Schiffermüller], 1775)
 ウスキカギバヒメハマキ  — Ancylis unculana (Haworth, [1811])
 ニシベツヒメハマキ  — Ancylis unguicella (Linnaeus, 1758)
 コゲチャカギバヒメハマキ  — Ancylis upupana (Treitschke, 1835)
 イチイヒメハマキ  — Coenobiodes abietiella (Matsumura, 1931)
 ロッコウヒメハマキ  — Coenobiodes acceptana Kuznetzov, 1973
 ヒノキカワモグリガ  — Coenobiodes granitalis (Butler, 1881)
 コギンボシキヒメハマキ  — Enarmonia decor Kawabe, 1978
 和名未定  — Enarmonia infausta Walsingham, 1900
 ギンボシキヒメハマキ  — Enarmonia major (Walsingham, 1900)
 エゾギンボシヒメハマキ  — Enarmonia minuscula Kuznetzov, 1981
 クロキマダラヒメハマキ  — Enarmonodes aeologlypta (Meyrick, 1936)
 アイノキマダラヒメハマキ  — Enarmonodes aino Kuznetzov, 1968
 和名未定  — Enarmonodes kunashirica Kuznetzov, 1969
 和名未定  — Enarmonodes recreantana (Kennel, 1900)
 ニセハギカギバヒメハマキ  — Semnostola magnifisa (Kuznetzov, 1964)
 セサンカクモンヒメハマキ  — Semnostola triangulata Nasu & Kogi, 1997
 ツマアカクロヒメハマキ  — Semnostola trisignifera Kuznetzov, 1970
 ムルティヒメハマキ  — Eucosmomorpha multicolor Kuznetzov, 1964
 ブナヒメハマキ  — Rhopalovalva amabilis Oku, 1974
 ギンヅマヒメハマキ  — Rhopalovalva exartemana (Kennel, 1901)
 サザナミキヒメハマキ  — Rhopalovalva lascivana (Christoph, 1881)
 モリウチヒメハマキ  — Rhopalovalva moriutii Oku, 2005
 キカギヒメハマキ  — Rhopalovalva pulchra (Butler, 1879)
 トガリバシロヒメハマキ  — Acroclita catharotorna Meyrick, 1935
 グミハイジロヒメハマキ  — Acroclita elaeagnivora Oku, 1979
 グミシロテンヒメハマキ  — Acroclita gumicola Oku, 1979
 マダラスキバヒメハマキ  — Peridaedala algosa (Meyrick, 1912)
 チビマダラヒメハマキ  — Peridaedala optabilana (Kuznetzov, 1979)
 イチゴツツヒメハマキ  — Pseudacroclita hapalaspis (Meyrick, 1931)
 クリミドリシンクイガ  — Fibuloides aestuosa (Meyrick, 1912)
 コモトグロヒメハマキ  — Fibuloides cyanopsis (Meyrick, 1912)
 モトゲヒメハマキ  — Fibuloides japonica (Kawabe, 1978)
 レイシウスバヒメハマキ  — Fibuloides nigrovenana (Kuznetzov, 1988)
 モッコクヒメハマキ  — Eucoenogenes ancyrota (Meyrick, 1907)
 キイロヒメハマキ  — Eucoenogenes teliferana (Christoph, 1881)
 ニセシロヒメシンクイ  — Spilonota albicana (Motschulsky, 1866)
 イスノキヒメハマキ  — Spilonota distyliana Moriuti, 1958
 カラマツヒメハマキ  — Spilonota eremitana Moriuti, 1972
 和名未定  — Spilonota laricana (Heinemann, 1863)
 リンゴハイイロヒメハマキ  — Spilonota lechriaspis Meyrick, 1932
 クロゲハイイロヒメハマキ  — Spilonota melanocopa (Meyrick, 1912)
 リンゴシロヒメハマキ  — Spilonota ocellana ([Denis & Schiffermüller], 1775)
 ハシバミシロヒメハマキ  — Spilonota prognathana (Snellen, 1883)
 モトアカヒメハマキ  — Spilonota semirufana (Christoph, 1881)
 ドクウツギツノエグリヒメハマキ  — Strepsicrates coriariae coriariae Oku, 1979
 バンジロウツノエグリヒメハマキ  — Strepsicrates semicanella (Walker, 1866)
 ニセウスキシロヒメハマキ  — Gibberifera hepaticana Kawabe & Nasu, 1994
 ウスキシロヒメハマキ  — Gibberifera simplana (Fischer von Röslerstamm, 1836)
 アカトドマツヒメハマキ  — Epinotia aciculana Falkovitsh, 1965
 ヒカゲヒメハマキ  — Epinotia albiguttata (Oku, 1974)
 クロツヅリヒメハマキ  — Epinotia aquila Kuznetzov, 1968
 タマヒメハマキ  — Epinotia autonoma Falkovitsh, 1965
 ツチイロヒメハマキ  — Epinotia autumnalis Oku, 2005
 ヒロオビヒメハマキ  — Epinotia bicolor (Walsingham, 1900)
 ダケカンバヒメハマキ  — Epinotia brunnichana (Linnaeus, 1767)
 ムモンツチイロヒメハマキ  — Epinotia bushiensis Kawabe, 1980
 トウヒハイイロヒメハマキ  — Epinotia cineracea Nasu, 1991
 ニセヤナギメムシガ  — Epinotia cinereana (Haworth, [1811])
 ミツシロモンヒメハマキ  — Epinotia contrariana (Christoph, 1881)
 アカバヒメハマキ  — Epinotia coryli Kuznetzov, 1970
 ミヤマヤナギヒメハマキ  — Epinotia cruciana (Linnaeus, 1761)
 ニセイツカドモンヒメハマキ  — Epinotia demarniana (Fischer von Röslerstamm, 1839)
 エゾハイイロヒメハマキ  — Epinotia densiuncaria Kuznetzov, 1985
 クロマダラシロヒメハマキ  — Epinotia exquisitana (Christoph, 1881)
 オオナガバヒメハマキ  — Epinotia maculana (Fabricius, 1775)
 ハナウドモグリガ  — Epinotia majorana (Caradja, 1916)
 和名未定  — Epinotia mercuriana (Frölich, 1828)
 ヤナギメムシガ  — Epinotia nisella (Clerck, 1759)
 和名未定  — Epinotia notoceliana Kuznetzov, 1985
 イツカドモンヒメハマキ  — Epinotia pentagonana (Kennel, 1901)
 トウヒツヅリヒメハマキ千島亜種  — Epinotia piceae brevivalva Kuznetzov, 1968
 トウヒツヅリヒメハマキ日本本土亜種  — Epinotia piceae piceae (Issiki, 1961)
 トウヒシロスジヒメハマキ  — Epinotia piceicola Kuznetzov, 1970
 ハイマツコヒメハマキ  — Epinotia pinicola Kuznetzov, 1969
 クシヒゲヒメハマキ  — Epinotia pygmaeana (Hübner, [1799])
 カギモンヒメハマキ  — Epinotia ramella (Linnaeus, 1785)
 セクロモンヒメハマキ  — Epinotia rasdolnyana (Christoph, 1881)
 マツヒメハマキ  — Epinotia rubiginosana koraiensis Falkovitsh, 1965
 ムモンハンノメムシガ  — Epinotia rubricana Kuznetzov, 1968
 セシロモンヒメハマキ  — Epinotia salicicolana Kuznetzov, 1968
 ニレマダラヒメハマキ  — Epinotia signatana (Douglas, 1845)
 セウスモンヒメハマキ  — Epinotia solandriana (Linnaeus, 1758)
 和名未定  — Epinotia subocellana (Donovan, 1806)
 ニセクシヒゲヒメハマキ  — Epinotia subsequana (Haworth, [1811])
 ハンノメムシガ  — Epinotia tenerana ussurica Kuznetzov, 1968
 カンバウスモンヒメハマキ  — Epinotia tetraquetrana (Haworth, [1811])
 フタシロモンヒメハマキ  — Epinotia trigonella (Linnaeus, 1758)
 ツルギクシヒゲヒメハマキ  — Epinotia tsurugisana Oku, 2005
 ニレチャイロヒメハマキ  — Epinotia ulmi Kuznetzov, 1966
 ニレコヒメハマキ  — Epinotia ulmicola Kuznetzov, 1966
 アトフタモンヒメハマキ  — Phaneta bimaculata (Kuznetzov, 1966)
 ウスツヤハイイロヒメハマキ  — Gypsonoma attrita Falkovitsh, 1965
 コヤナギヒメハマキ  — Gypsonoma bifasciata Kuznetzov, 1966
 ネグロヒメハマキ  — Gypsonoma dealbana (Frölich, 1828)
 ウスネグロヒメハマキ  — Gypsonoma ephoropa (Meyrick, 1931)
 アカムラサキヒメハマキ  — Gypsonoma erubesca Kawabe, 1978
 ヒラノヒメハマキ  — Gypsonoma hiranoi Kawabe, 1980
 ムモンハイイロヒメハマキ  — Gypsonoma holocrypta (Meyrick, 1931)
 ムジシロチャヒメハマキ  — Gypsonoma kawabei Nasu & Kusunoki, 1998
 ウスモンハイイロヒメハマキ  — Gypsonoma maritima Kuznetzov, 1970
 ポプラヒメハマキ  — Gypsonoma minutana (Hübner, [1799])
 ナカオビウスツヤヒメハマキ  — Gypsonoma nitidulana (Lienig & Zeller, 1846)
 タテヤマヒメハマキ  — Gypsonoma oppressana (Treitschke, 1835)
 ヒロオビネグロヒメハマキ  — Gypsonoma rivulata Oku, 2005
 カオジロネグロヒメハマキ  — Gypsonoma sociana (Haworth, [1811])
 マツトビマダラシンムシガ  — Gravitarmata margarotana (Heinemann, 1863)
 マツアカシンムシ  — Rhyacionia dativa Heinrich, 1928
 ニセマツアカヒメハマキ  — Rhyacionia pinivorana (Lienig & Zeller, 1846)
 マツツマアカシンムシ  — Rhyacionia simulata Heinrich, 1928
 アトシロモンヒメハマキ  — Rhyacionia vernalis Nasu & Kawahara, 2004
 ワシヤシントメヒメハマキ  — Rhyacionia washiyai Kono & Sawamoto, 1940
 マツアカツヤシンムシ  — Retinia coeruleostriana (Caradja, 1939)
 マツズアカシンムシ  — Retinia cristata (Walsingham, 1900)
 和名未定  — Retinia immanitana (Kuznetzov, 1969)
 カラマツカサガ  — Retinia impropria (Meyrick, 1932)
 エゾズアカヒメハマキ  — Retinia jezoensis Nasu, 1991
 ツマクロテンヒメハマキ  — Retinia monopunctata (Oku, 1968)
 和名未定  — Retinia resinella (Linnaeus, 1758)
 コツマキクロヒメハマキ  — Hendecaneura apicipicta Walsingham, 1900
 ツマキクロヒメハマキ  — Hendecaneura cervina Walsingham, 1900
 オオツマキクロヒメハマキ  — Hendecaneura impar Walsingham, 1900
 ツツジヒメシンクイ  — Hendecaneura rhododendrophaga Nasu & Komai, 1997
 ウスシロモンヒメハマキ  — Notocelia autolitha (Meyrick, 1931)
 エゾシロヒメハマキ  — Notocelia incarnatana (Hübner, [1796-1799])
 ニセバラシロヒメハマキ  — Notocelia nimia Falkovitsh, 1965
 ハマナスヒメハマキ  — Notocelia plumbea Nasu, 1980
 バラシロヒメハマキ  — Notocelia rosaecolana (Doubleday, 1850)
 ヤクシマヒメハマキ  — Notocelia yakushimensis Kawabe, 1974
 和名未定  — Epiblema ermolenkoi Kuznetzov, 1968
 シロモンチャヒメハマキ  — Epiblema expressanum (Christoph, 1881)
 ヨモギネムシガ  — Epiblema foenellum (Linnaeus, 1758)
 クロウンモンヒメハマキ  — Epiblema inconspicum (Walsingham, 1900)
 ニセシロモンクロヒメハマキ  — Epiblema macrorris Walsingham, 1900
 プライヤヒメハマキ  — Epiblema pryeranum (Walsingham, 1900)
 ギンスジアカチャヒメハマキ千島亜種  — Epiblema quinquefascianum kurilensis Kuznetzov, 1968
 ギンスジアカチャヒメハマキ日本本土亜種  — Epiblema quinquefascianum quinquefascianum (Matsumura, 1900)
 ウンモンサザナミヒメハマキ  — Epiblema rimosanum (Christoph, 1881)
 スギヒメハマキ  — Epiblema sugii Kawabe, 1976
 スソクロモンヒメハマキ  — Eucosma abacana (Erschoff, 1877)
 シロズスソモンヒメハマキ  — Eucosma aemulana (Schläger, 1848)
 ミヤマスソモンヒメハマキ  — Eucosma aspidiscana (Hübner, [1817])
 クロモンシロヒメハマキ  — Eucosma brachysticta Meyrick, 1935
 和名未定  — Eucosma caliacrana (Caradja, 1931)
 ニセモンシロスソモンヒメハマキ  — Eucosma campoliliana ([Denis & Schiffermüller], 1775)
 アザミスソモンヒメハマキ  — Eucosma cana (Haworth, [1811])
 ソトジロトガリヒメハマキ  — Eucosma catharaspis (Meyrick, 1922)
 スソモンハイイロヒメハマキ  — Eucosma certana Kuznetzov, 1967
 キガシラスソモンヒメハマキ  — Eucosma confunda Kuznetzov, 1966
 オヒルギヒメハマキ  — Eucosma coniogramma Clarke, 1976
 オオコゲチャスソモンヒメハマキ  — Eucosma denigratana (Kennel, 1901)
 オオハイスソモンヒメハマキ  — Eucosma discernata Kuznetzov, 1966
 カバイロスソモンヒメハマキ  — Eucosma glebana (Snellen, 1883)
 ホソバウンモンヒメハマキ  — Eucosma hohenwartiana ([Denis & Schiffermüller], 1775)
 ホソバシロヒメハマキ  — Eucosma lacteata (Treitschke, 1835)
 トビモンシロヒメハマキ  — Eucosma metzneriana (Treitschke, 1830)
 モンシロスソモンヒメハマキ  — Eucosma niveicaput (Walsingham, 1900)
 マエグロスソモンヒメハマキ  — Eucosma obumbratana (Lienig & Zeller, 1846)
 スソクロモンアカチャヒメハマキ  — Eucosma ommatoptera kurilensis Falkovitsh, 1968
 オオカバスソモンヒメハマキ  — Eucosma rigidana (Snellen, 1883)
 和名未定  — Eucosma scutiformis Meyrick, 1931
 コカバスソモンヒメハマキ  — Eucosma striatiradix Kuznetzov, 1964
 コシワヒメハマキ  — Eucosma striatulana Walsingham, 1900
 トビモンヒメハマキ  — Eucosma tundrana (Kennel, 1900)
 ウスチャスソモンヒメハマキ  — Eucosma wimmerana (Treitschke, 1835)
 コゲチャスソモンヒメハマキ  — Eucosma yasudai Nasu, 1982
 キガシラアカネヒメハマキ  — Lepteucosma huebneriana (Koçak, 1980)
 キベリヒメハマキ  — Lepteucosma shikokuensis (Kawabe, 1984)
 コスキバヒメハマキ  — Melanodaedala melanoneura (Meyrick, 1912)
 チャイロヒメハマキ  — Epibactra usuiana Kawabe, 1976
 ウスマダラヒメハマキ  — Pelochrista decolorana (Freyer, [1840])
 オオウスシロモンヒメハマキ  — Pelochrista mollitana (Zeller, 1847)
 コウンモンヒメハマキ  — Pelochrista notocelioides Oku, 1972
 フタオビチャヒメハマキ  — Pelochrista umbraculana (Eversmann, 1844)
 ドアイウンモンヒメハマキ  — Eriopsela kostjuki (Kuznetzov, 1973)
 ダイセツヒメハマキ  — Eriopsela quadrana (Hübner, [1813])
 和名未定  — Thiodia citrana (Hübner, [1796-1799])
 ノギクメムシガ  — Thiodia dahurica (Falkovitsh, 1965)
 シロスジヒロバヒメハマキ  — Thiodia torridana (Lederer, 1859)
 和名未定  — Rhopobota bicolor Kawabe, 1989
 マダラカマヒメハマキ  — Rhopobota falcata Nasu, 1999
 ハリギリミドリヒメハマキ  — Rhopobota grypodes (Meyrick, 1912)
 オオセシロヒメハマキ  — Rhopobota ilexi Kuznetzov, 1969
 ヤマツツジマダラヒメハマキ  — Rhopobota kaempferiana (Oku, 1971)
 アケビヒメハマキ  — Rhopobota latipennis (Walsingham, 1900)
 モチツツジマダラヒメハマキ  — Rhopobota macrosepalana (Oku, 1971)
 クロネハイイロヒメハマキ  — Rhopobota naevana (Hübner, [1814-1817])
 ソヨゴチビヒメハマキ  — Rhopobota okui Nasu, 2000
 シロオビマダラヒメハマキ  — Rhopobota relicta (Kuznetzov, 1968)
 チャオビマダラヒメハマキ  — Rhopobota shikokuensis (Oku, 1971)
 シロズマダラヒメハマキ  — Rhopobota toshimai (Kawabe, 1978)
 セシロヒメハマキ  — Rhopobota ustomaculana (Curtis, 1831)
 ハマゴウヒメシンクイ  — Noduliferola abstrusa Kuznetzov, 1973
 アオイヒメハマキ  — Crocidosema plebejana Zeller, 1847
 マキヒメハマキ  — Makivora hagiyai Oku, 1979
 フクギモグリヒメハマキ  — Heleanna fukugi Nasu, 1999
 ウスズミクロモンヒメハマキ  — Heleanna tokyoensis Nasu, 2007
 ショウベンノキヒメハマキ  — Heleanna turpinivora Nasu & Byun, 2007
 和名未定  — Pseudococcyx turionella (Linnaeus, 1758)
 マダラコケイロヒメハマキ  — Herpystis tinctoria Meyrick, 1916
 ツマキハイイロヒメハマキ  — Antichlidas holocnista Meyrick, 1931
 センダンヒメハマキ  — Loboschiza koenigiana (Fabricius, 1775)
 ミナミキオビヒメハマキ  — Demeijerella catharota (Meyrick, 1928)
 シロスジヘリホシヒメハマキ  — Dichrorampha albistriana Komai, 1979
 ヘリホシヒメハマキ  — Dichrorampha cancellatana Kennel, 1901
 ハイヘリホシヒメハマキ  — Dichrorampha canimaculana Komai, 1979
 ムモンヘリホシヒメハマキ  — Dichrorampha impuncta Komai, 1979
 アカムラサキヘリホシヒメハマキ  — Dichrorampha interponana (Danilevsky, 1960)
 キオビヘリホシヒメハマキ  — Dichrorampha latiflavana Caradja, 1916
 オクヘリホシヒメハマキ  — Dichrorampha okui Komai, 1979
 ホソキオビヘリホシヒメハマキ  — Dichrorampha petiverella (Linnaeus, 1758)
 ウスキヘリホシヒメハマキ  — Dichrorampha testacea Komai, 1979
 コキオビヘリホシヒメハマキ  — Dichrorampha vancouverana McDunnough, 1935
 シロテンボカシヒメハマキ  — Thaumatotibia hemitoma (Diakonoff, 1976)
 メヒルギアシブトヒメハマキ  — Cryptophlebia amamiana Komai & Nasu, 2003
 コアシブトヒメハマキ  — Cryptophlebia distorta (Hampson, 1905)
 オヒルギアシブトヒメハマキ  — Cryptophlebia horii Kawabe, 1987
 クロモンアシブトヒメハマキ  — Cryptophlebia nota Kawabe, 1978
 アシブトヒメハマキ  — Cryptophlebia ombrodelta (Lower, 1898)
 ヤエヤマヒルギアシブトヒメハマキ  — Cryptophlebia palustris Komai & Nasu, 2003
 リュウキュウアシブトヒメハマキ  — Cryptophlebia repletana (Walker, 1863)
 オオアシブトヒメハマキ  — Cryptophlebia yasudai Kawabe, 1972
 アズキサヤムシガ  — Matsumuraeses azukivora (Matsumura, 1910)
 タイツリオオギサヤヒメハマキ  — Matsumuraeses capax Razowski & Yasuda, 1975
 ダイズサヤムシガ  — Matsumuraeses falcana (Walsingham, 1900)
 マメヒメサヤムシガ  — Matsumuraeses phaseoli (Matsumura, 1900)
 クズヒメサヤムシガ  — Matsumuraeses ussuriensis (Caradja, 1916)
 ヒロバヒメサヤムシガ  — Matsumuraeses vicina Kuznetzov, 1973
 ナナカマドヒメシンクイ  — Grapholita andabatana (Wolff, 1957)
 サクラシンクイガ  — Grapholita cerasivora (Matsumura, 1917)
 ヨツスジヒメシンクイ  — Grapholita delineana (Walker, 1863)
 スモモヒメシンクイガ  — Grapholita dimorpha Komai, 1979
 セシモフリヒメハマキ  — Grapholita endrosias (Meyrick, 1907)
 和名未定  — Grapholita exigua Kuznetzov, 1972
 シタジロヒメハマキ  — Grapholita fimana Snellen, 1883
 スキバヒメハマキ  — Grapholita hyalitis (Meyrick, 1909)
 リンゴコシンクイ  — Grapholita inopinata (Heinrich, 1928)
 エゾシタジロヒメハマキ  — Grapholita jesonica (Matsumura, 1931)
 和名未定  — Grapholita kurilana Kuznetzov, 1976
 ミドリバエヒメハマキ  — Grapholita latericia Komai, 1999
 ナシヒメシンクイ  — Grapholita molesta (Busck, 1916)
 クロミドリバエヒメハマキ  — Grapholita okui Komai, 1999
 フタスジヒメハマキ  — Grapholita pallifrontana Lienig & Zeller, 1846
 和名未定  — Grapholita pavonana (Walsingham, 1900)
 ハマナスヒメシンクイ  — Grapholita rosana Danilevsky, 1968
 コスソキンモンヒメハマキ  — Grapholita scintillana Christoph, 1881
 イバラヒメシンクイ  — Grapholita tenebrosana Duponchel, 1843
 ヤブマメヒメシンクイ  — Grapholita yasudai Komai, 1999
 和名未定  — Pammene aceris Kuznetzov, 1968
 イバラムモンヒメハマキ  — Pammene adusta Kuznetzov, 1972
 アイノセシロオビヒメハマキ  — Pammene ainorum Kuznetzov, 1968
 フタキモンヒメハマキ  — Pammene aurana (Fabricius, 1775)
 タカダツヤスジクロヒメハマキ  — Pammene caeruleata Kuznetzov, 1970
 和名未定  — Pammene exscribana Kuznetzov, 1986
 ニセセキオビヒメハマキ  — Pammene flavicellula Kuznetzov, 1971
 セホソオビヒメハマキ  — Pammene fulminea Komai, 1999
 トウキヒメハマキ  — Pammene gallicana (Guenée, 1845)
 ホソバヒメシンクイ  — Pammene germmana (Hübner, [1796-1799])
 和名未定  — Pammene griseana Walsingham, 1900
 アトハイジロヒメハマキ  — Pammene griseomaculana Kuznetzov, 1960
 ホソシタジロヒメハマキ  — Pammene grunini (Kuznetzov, 1960)
 和名未定  — Pammene ignorata Kuznetzov, 1968
 和名未定  — Pammene insolentana Kuznetzov, 1964
 セキオビヒメハマキ  — Pammene japonica Kuznetzov, 1968
 ネモロウサヒメハマキ  — Pammene nemorosa Kuznetzov, 1968
 ウスグロヒメハマキ  — Pammene obscurana (Stephens, 1834)
 コトドマツヒメハマキ  — Pammene ochsenheimeriana (Lienig & Zeller, 1846)
 シタジロシロモンヒメハマキ  — Pammene orientana Kuznetzov, 1960
 トウヒコハマキ  — Pammene piceae Komai, 1999
 シコタンコハマキ  — Pammene shicotanica Kuznetzov, 1968
 コツガノヒメハマキ  — Pammene tsugae Issiki, 1961
 ブナヒメシンクイ  — Pseudopammene fagivora Komai, 1980
 フトキオビヒメハマキ  — Parapammene aurifascia Kuznetzov, 1981
 スジオビクロヒメハマキ  — Parapammene dichroramphana (Kennel, 1900)
 コスジオビクロヒメハマキ  — Parapammene glaucana (Kennel, 1901)
 コウススジヒメハマキ  — Parapammene imitatrix Kuznetzov, 1986
 ウススジヒメハマキ  — Parapammene inobservata Kuznetzov, 1962
 和名未定  — Parapammene petulantana (Kennel, 1901)
 オリーブヒメハマキ  — Parapammene reversa Komai, 1999
 コスジオビキヒメハマキ  — Parapammene selectana (Christoph, 1881)
 和名未定  — Strophedra magna Komai, 1999
 カシワギンオビヒメハマキ  — Strophedra nitidana (Fabricius, 1794)
 和名未定  — Strophedra quercivora (Meyrick, 1920)
 和名未定  — Andrioplecta pulverula (Meyrick, 1912)
 マメシンクイガ  — Leguminivora glycinivorella (Matsumura, 1898)
 クララシンクイガ  — Fulcrifera orientis (Kuznetzov, 1966)
 カエデシンクイガ  — Cydia acerivora (Danilevsky, 1968)
 シロツメモンヒメハマキ  — Cydia amurensis (Danilevsky, 1968)
 スギカサヒメハマキ  — Cydia cryptomeriae (Issiki, 1961)
 ヨツメヒメハマキ  — Cydia danilevskyi (Kuznetzov, 1973)
 コヨツメヒメハマキ  — Cydia ermolenkoi (Kuznetzov, 1968)
 和名未定  — Cydia fagiglandana (Zeller, 1841)
 サンカクモンヒメハマキ  — Cydia glandicolana (Danilevsky, 1968)
 シロスジカサガ  — Cydia illutana dahuricolana (Kuznetzov, 1962)
 シタウスキヒメハマキ  — Cydia indivisa (Danilevsky, 1963)
 シロアシヨツメモンヒメハマキ  — Cydia japonensis Kawabe, 1980
 和名未定  — Cydia kamijoi (Oku, 1968)
 クリミガ  — Cydia kurokoi (Amsel, 1960)
 カラマツミキモグリガ  — Cydia laricicolana (Kuznetzov, 1960)
 エダキオビヒメハマキ  — Cydia leguminana (Lienig & Zeller, 1864)
 ミナミツマジロヒメハマキ  — Cydia leucostoma (Meyrick, 1912)
 イヌエンジュサヤモグリガ  — Cydia maackiana (Danilevsky, 1963)
 和名未定  — Cydia malesana (Meyrick, 1920)
 エンドウシンクイ  — Cydia nigricana (Fabricius, 1794)
 トドマツミキモグリガ  — Cydia pactolana yasudai (Oku, 1968)
 ツヤツチイロシンクイ  — Cydia prismatica (Meyrick, 1911)
 ニセエンジュヒメハマキ  — Cydia secretana (Kuznetzov, 1973)
 ミヤマクロヒメハマキ  — Cydia silvana (Kuznetzov, 1970)
 エゾマツカサガ  — Cydia strobilella (Linnaeus, 1758)
 エンジュヒメハマキ  — Cydia trasias (Meyrick, 1928)
 クロホシカラマツミキモグリガ  — Cydia zebeana (Ratzeburg, 1840)
 クロモンカバマダラハマキ  — Mictocommosis nigromaculata (Issiki, 1930)
 オオナミモンマダラハマキ  — Charitographa mikadonis (Stringer, 1930)
 和名未定  — Thaumatographa aurosa (Diakonoff & Arita, 1976)
 クロモンベニマダラハマキ  — Thaumatographa decoris (Diakonoff & Arita, 1976)
 コクロモンベニマダラハマキ  — Thaumatographa eremnotorna (Diakonoff & Arita, 1976)
 和名未定  — Thaumatographa leucopyrga (Meyrick, 1912)
 和名未定  — Thaumatographa machaerophora (Diakonoff & Arita, 1976)
 オガサワラマダラハマキ  — Trymalitis escharia Clarke, 1976
 スジケマダラハマキ  — Lopharcha psathyra Diakonoff, 1989
 Lopharcha kinokuniana Nasu, 2008

Zyg